Jaimito Soares (born 10 June 2003) is an East Timorese professional footballer who plays as a defender for Karketu Dili. On 5 December 2021, he made his debut for the Timor-Leste national football team in the opening group A match of the 2020 AFF Championship against Thailand.

References

Living people
2003 births
East Timorese footballers
Timor-Leste international footballers
Association football defenders
Competitors at the 2021 Southeast Asian Games
Southeast Asian Games competitors for East Timor